The Taitung Art Museum is an art museum located in Taitung City, Taitung County, Taiwan.

History
The first stage of the museum building was opened on 15 December 2007. The second stage of the building was opened on 7 November 2009.

Architecture
The museum spans over an area of 3.96 hectares. It is divided into two exhibition halls, which are Mountain Song Hall and Ocean Dance Hall.

Transportation
The museum is accessible by bus from Taitung Station of the Taiwan Railways.

See also
 List of museums in Taiwan

References

External links
  

2007 establishments in Taiwan
Art museums and galleries in Taiwan
Museums established in 2007
Museums in Taitung County